Bloodworth is a 2010 drama film directed by Shane Dax Taylor and based on Provinces of Night, a novel  by William Gay. The film stars Val Kilmer, Kris Kristofferson, and Dwight Yoakam. Toby Keith was also set to star in the film, but later dropped out.

Plot 
It's been 40 years since E. F. Bloodworth (Kris Kristofferson) abandoned his loving wife and sons for a life on the road as a full-time traveling musician. Now at the end of the line, Bloodworth reappears, forced to reckon with the stale aftermath of his departure. With his ex-wife Julia (Frances Conroy) mentally destroyed and his three sons, Warren (Val Kilmer), Boyd (Dwight Yoakam) and Brady (W. Earl Brown) soured by years of anger toward both him and each other, Bloodworth's only solace is a budding relationship with Fleming, the grandson he never knew. But when Fleming meets Raven (Hilary Duff), the woman of his dreams, will Bloodworth's presence force history to repeat itself?

Cast
 Val Kilmer as Warren Bloodworth
 Kris Kristofferson as E. F. Bloodworth
 Hilary Duff as Raven Lee Halfacre
 Reece Thompson as Fleming Bloodworth
 Dwight Yoakam as Boyd Bloodworth
 Frances Conroy as Julia Bloodworth
 W. Earl Brown as Brady Bloodworth
 Hilarie Burton as Hazel
 Sheila Kelley as Louise Halfacre
 Hank Williams III as Trigger Lipscomb
 Barry Corbin as Itchy

Production
The film is directed by Shane Taylor and adapted from the novel, Provinces of Night, by William Gay. Kenny Burke produced the film with Taylor and Brown. Music producer T-Bone Burnett supervised the film's music, which includes original compositions by Kris Kristofferson.

Filming took place in April and May 2009 in Wilmington, North Carolina.

Release
An early version of the film premiered at the 2010 Santa Barbara International Film Festival on February 6, 2010; it later screened as a work in progress at the 2010 Nashville Film Festival on April 15–22, 2010. The completed version of the film was part of the 17th Annual Austin Film Festival during October 21 to 28 in Austin, Texas. It is currently available as a part of the Netflix Instant Play.

Reception
On Rotten Tomatoes the film has an approval rating of 50% based on reviews from 8 critics.

References

External links
 

2010 films
American drama films
Films shot in North Carolina
Films set in Tennessee
2010s English-language films
2010s American films